is a Japanese alpine skier. He competed at the 1972 Winter Olympics and the 1976 Winter Olympics.

References

1950 births
Living people
Japanese male alpine skiers
Olympic alpine skiers of Japan
Alpine skiers at the 1972 Winter Olympics
Alpine skiers at the 1976 Winter Olympics
Sportspeople from Gunma Prefecture
20th-century Japanese people